South Carroll High School (SCHS) is a four-year public high school in Sykesville in Carroll County, Maryland, United States. The school is located near the southwest corner of Carroll County on Liberty Road between Maryland Route 27 and Maryland Route 97.

About the school
South Carroll School was established in 1965 in Sykesville, Maryland as part of the Carroll County Public School system.

Students
As of 20222023 the enrollment is 924.

Extra-curricular activities

South Carroll High School has won the following state championships.

South Carroll High School State Champions
Boys' Cross Country: 1997, 1998, 2000
Girls' Cross Country: 2007
Field Hockey: 1980, 1983, 1991, 2002, 2018
Girls' Basketball: 1977-78
Baseball: 1999, 2002
Volleyball: 2007
Wrestling: 2014, 2015, 2016, 2017, 2022
Marching Band: 1996, 1997

Additionally, South Carroll High School counts two former varsity athletes as notable alumni. Josh Boone and Marshall Strickland both played men's basketball in the late 1990s and early 2000s (decade). Boone went on to win an NCAA Division I championship in 2004 as a forward on the University of Connecticut men's team and was drafted in 2006 by the NBA's New Jersey Nets as the 23rd overall pick. Strickland was the starting point guard at Indiana University for three years. In 2021, The Cavaliers varsity football team went 12-0 and made the 1A/2A MMPSAA State Championship, But lost to Dunbar High School.

Notable alumni
Josh Boone - NBA player
Blair Grubb - Physician, researcher and writer
Mike Jenkins- world-class strongman
Mike Mooney - a tackle that went to Georgia Tech Yellow Jackets and the San Diego Chargers
Brian Plummer - College football player, University of Maryland
Lorenza Ponce - vocalist, string player, songwriter
Marshall Strickland - college basketball player

References

External links
 

Educational institutions established in 1965
Public high schools in Maryland
Carroll County Public Schools (Maryland)
1965 establishments in Maryland
Sykesville, Maryland